Ryan Brehm (born April 5, 1986) is an American professional golfer.

Amateur career
Brehm played college golf at Michigan State University where he won five times and helped lead MSU to three Big Ten Championships. He later also served as an assistant coach for the team.

Professional career
Brehm played on PGA Tour Canada in 2014 and 2015. His best finish was tied for second at the 2015 Great Waterway Classic. He played on the Web.com Tour in 2016, winning the final regular season event, the WinCo Foods Portland Open. This win moved him to fourth on the money list and secured him a PGA Tour card for 2017.

Brehm earned his first PGA Tour win at the 2022 Puerto Rico Open. Prior to his win, Brehm had never finished in the top 10 of a PGA Tour event, was ranked 773rd in the world, and on the only start of a medical extension.

Professional wins (6)

PGA Tour wins (1)

Korn Ferry Tour wins (2)

Korn Ferry Tour playoff record (1–0)

Other wins (3)
2009 Michigan Open
2010 Michigan Open
2014 Michigan Open

Results in major championships

"T" = Tied
CUT = missed the halfway cut
Note: Brehm only played in the PGA Championship and the U.S. Open.

Results in The Players Championship

CUT = missed the halfway cut

See also
2016 Web.com Tour Finals graduates
2019 Korn Ferry Tour Finals graduates

References

External links

American male golfers
PGA Tour golfers
Korn Ferry Tour graduates
Golfers from Michigan
People from Mount Pleasant, Michigan
1986 births
Living people